Mauritius competed at the 2011 World Aquatics Championships in Shanghai, China between July 16 and 31, 2011.

Swimming

Mauritius qualified three swimmers.

Men

Women

References

Nations at the 2011 World Aquatics Championships
2011
World Aquatics Championships